João Natailton Ramos dos Santos or simply Joãozinho (born 25 December 1988) is a Brazilian professional footballer who plays as a right or left winger for Sochi.

Career

Levski Sofia
He signed his five-year-contract with Levski Sofia on 7 December 2007. The same day he made his first training with his new club. Joãozinho made his unofficial debut in a friendly match against FC Dynamo Kyiv on 20 January 2008. He played for 45 minutes. Levski lost the match with a result of 1–2.

His initial number was supposed to be 20, but when Hristo Yovov left Levski Sofia there were no troubles for Joãozinho to play with number 10.

He scored his first goal for Levski on 10 February 2008 in a friendly match against FC Rapid București. Joãozinho scored a penalty kick. Joãozinho made his official debut for Levski on 24 February 2008 in a match against Chernomorets Burgas, the match from Bulgarian A PFG. Levski won the match. The result was 2–1, after goals from Jean Carlos and Daniel Borimirov. He scored his first goal for Levski on 22 March 2008 against Belasitsa Petrich in the 87th minute, making the result 4-0 for Levski. He directed the ball into the net after a shot by Darko Tasevski which was going out of the goalkeeper's frame.

He became a Champion of Bulgaria in 2009. He was also honoured with a fairplay award for 2009 due to not receiving a single booking in the A PFG during that year.

Krasnodar
On 30 January 2011, after days of speculations, Joãozinho revealed that he had moved to Krasnodar. In early February 2011, the transfer was finalized and the Brazilian signed his contract with the Russian club. On 6 February 2011, Joãozinho made his unofficial debut for the team from Krasnodar, playing the first 63 minutes in the 2–2 draw with Ukrainian side SC Tavriya Simferopol in a friendly match. On 15 February 2011, he scored a goal and provided an assist in the 4–0 rout against Czech club FK Baumit Jablonec. 
Joãozinho's official debut came on 6 March 2011 in the 1–0 win against Amkar Perm in a Russian Cup match, with the Brazilian being in the starting line-up. His Russian Premier League debut occurred 6 days later in the 0–0 away draw with FC Anzhi Makhachkala. On 14 June 2011, the Brazilian opened his account for the team, netting twice in the 4–2 home win against Volga Nizhny Novgorod. He suffered a broken foot in a March 2015 match. He left Krasnodar at the end of the 2017–18 season.

Dynamo Moscow
On 23 July 2018, he signed a one-year contract with FC Dynamo Moscow. On 10 June 2019, he extended his contract for another year with an option to extend it for the 2020–21 season as well.

Sochi
On 11 August 2020, he signed with Sochi.

Career statistics

Honours

Club
Levski Sofia
 A PFG (1): 2009
 Bulgarian Supercup (1): 2009

Individual
 Russian Premier League – Krasnodar fans' and footballers' player of the season: 2013–2014
 List of 33 top players of the Russian league: 2013/14.

Personal life
In August 2016, he received Russian citizenship.

Joãozinho is dating the Russian model Lera Yalovets. In the fall of 2017 the couple announced that they are expecting their first child.

References

External links
 Joãozinho`s profile on Levski Sofia web-site
 Joãozinho`s profile on LevskiSofia.info
 Joãozinho`s profile on Portuguesa web-site
 

1988 births
Sportspeople from Sergipe
Naturalised citizens of Russia
Living people
Brazilian footballers
Russian footballers
Association football midfielders
Associação Portuguesa de Desportos players
PFC Levski Sofia players
FC Krasnodar players
FC Dynamo Moscow players
PFC Sochi players
First Professional Football League (Bulgaria) players
Russian Premier League players
Brazilian expatriate footballers
Russian expatriate footballers
Expatriate footballers in Bulgaria
Brazilian expatriate sportspeople in Bulgaria
Expatriate footballers in Russia
Brazilian expatriate sportspeople in Russia
Russian expatriate sportspeople in Bulgaria